This is the list of supermarket chains in Uganda.

Foreign owned supermarket chains

 Carrefour
 Game Stores
 Woolworths

Locally owned supermarket chains

Capital Shoppers
 Quality Supermarkets
 Kenjoy Supermarkets
 Checkers Supermarkets
 Mega Standard Supermarkets
 Super Supermarket
 Cynabel Supermarkets

References

Notes
 Shoprite of South Africa Quit Uganda In August 2021.

External links
 The Growth of Supermarkets And Its Implications for Smallholders In Uganda
 Supermarkets Brand Own Products In Search of Bigger Profit Margins
   Supermarkets In Africa: The Grocers Great Trek - Sluggish Home Market Pushing Big Retail Chains Northward

Uganda

Retailing in Uganda
Supermarket chains
Uganda